Port-Gentil International Airport  is an airport serving the city of Port-Gentil, in Ogooué-Maritime Province, Gabon.

The Port-Gentil VOR (Ident: PG) and Port-Gentil non-directional beacon (Ident: PG) are located on the field.

Airlines and destinations

Passenger

Accidents and incidents
 On October 12, 2011, a Nationale Regionale Transport EMB-120, registration ZS-PYO (MSN: 120245), performing a charter flight from Libreville to Port-Gentil (Gabon), overran the end of runway 21, and came to a stop with the nose gear intact but with both main gear struts bent backwards, causing the engines to "pitch down" together with the wings. A few passengers sustained minor injuries, but the aircraft was damaged beyond repair and was written off.

See also

 List of airports in Gabon
 Transport in Gabon

References

External links
Port-Gentil Airport
OpenStreetMap - Port-Gentil
OurAirports - Port-Gentil

Airports in Gabon